Abdulaziz Al-Kuwari (born 13 November 1979) is a Qatari rally driver. He made his World Rally Championship (WRC) debut on the 2012 Acropolis Rally, scoring a point with a tenth-place finish.

In January 2012 Al-Kuwari won the Qatar International Rally, a round of the Middle East Rally Championship, on his first outing in a Mini John Cooper Works S2000. He switched to a Mini John Cooper Works WRC for his WRC debut on the Acropolis Rally in May, entered by the Seashore Qatar Rally Team. He finished the rally in tenth place, becoming the first driver since Sébastien Ogier in 2008 Rally México to score points on their maiden WRC appearance.

Career results

Complete World Rally Championship results

WRC-2 results

References

External links
Profile on ewrc-results.com

Living people
1979 births
Qatari rally drivers
World Rally Championship drivers
Intercontinental Rally Challenge drivers